Burton Hersh is an American author, journalist and commentator.

Biography

He was graduated from Harvard Phi Beta Kappa, and studied in Germany from 1955 to 1956 as a Fulbright Scholar. He is Jewish, and he witnessed the aftermath of World War II and Nazi anti-semitism in Germany. He lived with a German family, including a man who had been a member of the Nazi Party and served in the German army during the war.

He has written   numerous books and articles, and  appeared often on television, including the Lehrer Report, Hardball with Chris Matthews, CNN with Paula Zahn and on The No Spin Zone with Bill O'Reilly.   He served as a Special Consultant on the BBC's ten-part series on the FBI and is listed in Who's Who in America.

Hersh is a Fellow of the Aspen Institute and is a member of the Council on Foreign Relations.

Publications
Hersh's articles have appeared in numerous publications including Esquire, The New York Times, The Washington Post and Huffington Post.

Fiction
 The Nature of the Beast. Tree Farms Books (2002)
 2003 Writers Notes Award for Best Fiction.
 The Ski People. New York: McGraw Hill (1968). .

Nonfiction
 Edward Kennedy: An Intimate Biography. Berkeley, Calif.: Counterpoint (2010)
 Bobby and J. Edgar: The Historic Face-off Between the Kennedys and J. Edgar Hoover that Transformed America. New York: Carroll & Graf (2007)
 The Shadow President: Ted Kennedy in Opposition. South Royalton, Vermont: Steerforth Press (1997)
 The Old Boys: The American Elite and the Origins of the CIA. Scribner's (1992). . .
 The Mellon Family: A Fortune In History. New York: Morrow (1978). . .
 Book of the Month Club selection and Fortune Book Club selection.
 The Education of Edward Kennedy. New York: Morrow (1972). .

References

External links
 Burton Hersh (official) at Blogspot
 Unredacted Episode 9: Interview with Burton Hersh at Mary Ferrell Foundation. Full transcript.

Harvard University alumni
Living people
Year of birth missing (living people)
Place of birth missing (living people)
American male journalists
Jewish American journalists
21st-century American novelists
American male novelists
21st-century American male writers
21st-century American non-fiction writers
American male non-fiction writers
21st-century American Jews